Chrysalis Records is a British record label that was founded in 1968. The name is both a reference to the pupal stage of a butterfly and a combination of its founders' names, Chris Wright and Terry Ellis. It started as the Ellis-Wright Agency.

History

Early years
In an interview for Jethro Tull's video 20 Years of Jethro Tull, released in 1988, Wright states "Chrysalis Records might have come into being anyway, you never know what might have happened, but Chrysalis Records really came into being because Jethro Tull couldn't get a record deal and MGM couldn't even get their name right on the record". This was after the single "Sunshine Day/Aeroplane" was incorrectly credited to 'Jethro Toe'.

Chrysalis entered into a licensing deal with Chris Blackwell's Island Records for distribution, based on the success of bands like Jethro Tull, Ten Years After and Procol Harum, which were promoted by the label. Jethro Tull signed with Reprise Records in the United States, which led Chrysalis to an American distribution deal with Reprise's parent company, Warner Bros. Records. This lasted from 1972 until U.S. Chrysalis switched to independent distribution in 1976. PolyGram handled international distribution and Festival Records covered Australia and New Zealand. In 1973, it signed British rock band UFO. Towards the end of the 1970s, the label began to extend its range of music, incorporating acts from the punk rock scene such as Generation X. The Chrysalis offshoot 2 Tone Records brought in bands such as The Specials and The Selecter.

In 1979, Chrysalis bought and distributed U.S. folk label Takoma Records, naming manager/producer Denny Bruce as president, who signed The Fabulous Thunderbirds and T-Bone Burnett. Jon Monday who was Vice President of Takoma Records prior to the acquisition continued as General Manager, later becoming Director of Marketing of Chrysalis Records.

Chrysalis made history in 1979 by creating the first "music video album", a videocassette featuring a corresponding music video for each song on Blondie's Eat to the Beat album (released at the same time as the LP).

In the 1980s, Chrysalis was at the forefront of the British new romantic movement with bands such as Gen X, Ultravox, and Spandau Ballet. The 1980s proved to be the most successful time for the label, whose roster then included Billy Idol, Pat Benatar, Blondie and Huey Lewis and the News. Chrysalis also distributed Animal Records, the short-lived label founded by Blondie guitarist, Chris Stein. In 1983, after the label re-established itself in New York, Eric Heckman, formally of Atlantic and Epic Records promotion took over as Senior Director of Promotion and Marketing. Also in 1983, Daniel Glass moved to Chrysalis as Director of New Music Marketing, advancing later to Senior Vice President. During the next two years Chrysalis broke Huey Lewis and the News, Billy Idol and Spandau Ballet in the United States, whilst Pat Benatar continued to find success on both the traditional and dance music charts.

In 1984, Chrysalis bought Ensign Records, a record label Nigel Grainge started in 1976 (with the label's name coming from the idea that 'N. signs' as in 'Nigel Signs') which would go on to have The Waterboys, World Party and Sinéad O'Connor on its roster in the late 1980s. Ensign joined TV marketing/compilations company Dover Records and dance label Cooltempo as part of the Chrysalis family, with Grainge staying on to run the label that he founded.

EMI

50% of the Chrysalis Records label was sold in 1989, then the remaining half in 1991 to Thorn EMI, with the Chrysalis Group (primarily a music publisher with other interests in radio and television production) setting up new indie labels such as Echo and Papillon in the mid 1990s. Chrysalis Records was folded into EMI subsidiary and flagship label EMI Records in 2005, with catalogue and artists such as Starsailor being shifted to EMI's main imprints. In 2010, BMG Rights Management bought Chrysalis Music's assets (the publishing division and The Echo Label), whilst the British Chrysalis Records catalogue (minus Robbie Williams, whose catalogue stayed behind with Universal's Island Records) was put up for sale by Universal Music Group in 2012 after its acquisition of EMI.

In July 2013, Warner Music Group completed acquisition of Parlophone Label Group, which includes the British Chrysalis catalogue, for £487 million. When Universal Music Group purchased EMI ownership of Chrysalis passed to UMG, and Warner Music Group acquired a part of EMI from UMG, including the original Chrysalis Records Ltd with its catalogue of 130 artists.

The American and Canadian Chrysalis catalogue, including artists such as Blondie, Huey Lewis and The News, and Pat Benatar, was acquired by CEMA, later EMI-Capitol Special Markets, which was folded into EMI Records Group (ERG) North America, and was then merged into Capitol Music Group, parent of former sister label Capitol Records, and is currently distributed by that label. Debbie Harry's only Chrysalis album released in the US, KooKoo, was later divested by Capitol after the merger. The Ramones' North American distribution catalogue was later acquired by another sister label of Capitol's, Geffen Records, distributed by Universal Music Enterprises, but the British distribution of Ramones' Chrysalis catalogue remained with Parlophone.

Later ownership
Chrysalis Records was bought in May 2016 from WMG in a deal led by Blue Raincoat Music's Jeremy Lascelles and Sade's Diamond Life producer Robin Millar. The agreement saw the co-founder and original owner of Chrysalis, Chris Wright, reunited with the label as non-executive chairman, 27 years after selling the company to EMI. Former Virgin Media boss Robert Devereux was also part of the original consortium.

Chrysalis Records has represented over 20,000 recordings comprising many British and other, chiefly American, rock and pop tracks from the 1960s to 1990s. Artists on the roster include The Specials, Sinead O'Connor, The Waterboys, Ten Years After, Debbie Harry, Fun Boy Three, Ultravox, Lucinda Williams, Dario G, Generation X, the Two Tone label, Grant Lee Buffalo, Everything but the Girl, Athlete, Fun Lovin' Criminals, Suzi Quatro, Steve Harley, Naked Eyes and many more.

After the 2016 purchase, the pre-2013 Chrysalis catalogues of namely Spandau Ballet, The Proclaimers, Jethro Tull and Ramones (only in the UK) stayed behind with WMG. The non-Ramones British reissues from Parlophone are distributed outside Europe by Rhino Entertainment, while the North American rights to Naked Eyes' albums, originally released by EMI America, stayed with Capitol Records, and the non-American rights to Belinda Carlisle's only Chrysalis album, A Woman & a Man, were ceded to her former label, Virgin Records.

In 2018, the Cooltempo label was relaunched by Blue Raincoat Music with the release of the Eye Ring EP by Francesca Lombardo and Infinity Ink's debut album House of Infinity. In August 2019, music rights company, Reservoir, partnered with Blue Raincoat, to make the Chrysalis record label part of Reservoir's extended global infrastructure and network.

2020s
Chrysalis Records relaunched itself as a front line label in February 2020, marking a return to releasing new music for the first time in over two decades. The first signing was in partnership with award winning independent label Partisan Records. The labels came together to sign British singer/songwriter Laura Marling in a fully co-branded global release. As the first project released on Chrysalis' re-launched frontline label, Marling's album, Song for Our Daughter, debuted in April 2020 to critical acclaim and a Mercury Prize nomination.

In September 2020, Chrysalis signed the indie singer-songwriter Liz Phair. Her raw lyrical style made her a trailblazer for a raft of female artists in alternative music, when she began to make records at the start of the 1990s. Phair's first album in a decade, Soberish, came out later in 2021.

On 6 August 2021, the second album from Laura Marling and Mike Lindsay's project, Lump (styled in all caps), titled Animal charted at number 65 on the UK Albums Chart, and was one of the Top 20 selling albums for that week (6 August - 12 August 2021). Chrysalis also reissued the first six albums by De La Soul on physical, digital and streaming platforms in early 2023.

Artists

 3 Man Island
 Mick Abrahams/Mick Abrahams Band
 Adam F
 The Adventures
 Ian Anderson
 The Angels (billed as Angel City in the United States)
 Armored Saint
 Arrested Development
 Arrow
 Art of Noise
 Athlete
 Bahamadia
 The Babys
 Claudja Barry
 Edyta Bartosiewicz
 Toni Basil
 Bedlam
 Pat Benatar
 The Bible
 The Big F
 Rory Block
 Blodwyn Pig
 Blonde on Blonde
 Blondie
 The Blue Aeroplanes
 Gary Brooker
 Enrique Bunbury
 Butt Trumpet
 Cajun Moon
 Belinda Carlisle
 Paul Carrack
 Catherine Wheel
 Carter USM
 Chick Churchill
 Child's Play
 The City
 Clouds
 Alice Cohen
 The Colourfield
 D Generation
 Daddy Freddy
 Jimmy Destri
 De La Soul
 Device
 Divinyls
 Micky Dolenz
 Dover
 Everything but the Girl
 The Fabulous Thunderbirds
 Simone Felice
 Feline
 Follow For Now
 Fun Boy Three
 Fun Lovin' Criminals
 Rory Gallagher
 Lee Garrett
 Gang Starr
 Generation X/Gen X
 Gentle Giant (except US and Canada)
 Ghost Dance
 Nick Gilder
 Go West
 Phillip Goodhand-Tait
 Bobcat Goldthwait
 Grand Prix
 David Grant
 Max Carl Gronenthal
 Guru
 Steve Hackett (US)
 Geri Halliwell
 Paul Hardcastle
 Ben Harper
 Roy Harper (US)
 Debbie Harry
 Chesney Hawkes
 Boo Hewerdine
 The Housemartins
 Ian Hunter
 Icehouse
 Billy Idol
 Innocence
 Jazz Got Soul
 Jellybean
 Jeffrey Gaines
 Jethro Tull
 Joan Jett
 Bob Johnson & Pete Knight
 Mickey Jupp
 Kino
 Kiss that
 Leo Kottke
 Greg Lake
 Amanda Lear
 Alvin Lee
 Huey Lewis and the News
 Leyton Buzzards
 Linx
 Living in a Box
 LUMP
 Mandalaband
 Laura Marling
 Masters of Reality
 Frankie Miller
 Mutha's Day Out
 The Next School
 Sinéad O'Connor
 Pere Ubu
 Liz Phair
 Astor Piazzolla
 Cozy Powell
 Power Station (except the US)
 Maddy Prior & June Tabor
 The Proclaimers
 The Permanent Cure
 Procol Harum
 Brian Protheroe
 Q-Tips
 Trevor Rabin (except South Africa)
 Racing Cars
 Ramones 1989-2006 (UK only)
 Rappin' 4-Tay
 Robbie Williams
 John Dawson Read
 Runrig
 Emeli Sandé 
 Bridget St John
 Leo Sayer (except US and Canada)
 Michael Schenker Group
 2nd Vision
 Sea Hags
 The Selecter
 Shanghai (formerly Spider)
 Lucie Silvas
 Simple Minds
 Slaughter
 Sonia
 Spandau Ballet
 The Specials (US)
 Split Enz (except New Zealand and Australia)
 Stage Dolls (US)
 Starsailor
 Steeleye Span
 Stiff Little Fingers
 Karlheinz Stockhausen
 Supertramp (except the US)
 Sylvester
 Ten Years After
 Ian Thomas Band
 Richard & Linda Thompson
 Tír na nÓg
 Toto Coelo
 Mary Travers
 Trouble Tribe
 Robin Trower
 The Pursuit Of Happiness
 2 Tribes
 Bonnie Tyler (US)
 Judie Tzuke
 UFO
 Ultravox
 Midge Ure
 Uriah Heep (US)
 The Venetians
 Vigil
 Vinnie Vincent Invasion
 John Waite
 Wartime
 Was (Not Was) (US)
 The Waterboys
 Waysted
 White Town
 Wild Turkey
 William The Conqueror
 The Winkies
 Wireless
 World Party
 Year Zero
 Zephyr

See also
The Echo Label (a Chrysalis Group indie label)
Papillon Records (a Chrysalis Group record label)
Lists of record labels

References

External links
 Official site for Chrysalis Records at Blue Raincoat Music
 Ben Sisario, "Warner Music Group Buys EMI Assets for $765 Million".  New York Times, "Media Decoder" blog, 7 February 2013
 Discogs page on Chrysalis Records
 
 

1968 establishments in the United Kingdom
2005 disestablishments in the United Kingdom
2016 establishments in the United Kingdom
Record labels established in 1968
Record labels disestablished in 2005
Record labels established in 2016
EMI
Defunct record labels of the United Kingdom
Pop record labels
IFPI members
Progressive rock record labels
New wave record labels
British independent record labels
Labels distributed by Universal Music Group
Labels distributed by Warner Music Group
British subsidiaries of foreign companies